The Hanriot HD.24 was a two-seat colonial police biplane aircraft built by Hanriot in the early 1920s.

References

Hanriot aircraft
Aircraft first flown in 1922
Biplanes